Knowledge: An Illustrated Magazine of Science was a British popular science magazine published from 1881 to 1918. Founded by astronomer Richard A. Proctor, the magazine started as a weekly periodical, becoming monthly in 1885. The magazine was known for its extensive correspondence columns.  Proctor himself, the first editor, was a significant contributor, and many of his discoveries or theoretical deductions first appeared in the magazine. Proctor was sometimes assisted in editorial duties by Edward Clodd. After Proctor's death in 1888, Arthur Cowper Ranyard took over editorship, then Harry Forbes Witherby after Ranyard's death.

References

External links 
 Knowledge - archives 1881/1886 full view at HathiTrust Digital Library
 Knowledge - archives 1888/1916 full view at HathiTrust Digital Library

Magazines established in 1881
Magazines disestablished in 1918
Popular science magazines
Science and technology magazines published in the United Kingdom
Weekly magazines published in the United Kingdom
Monthly magazines published in the United Kingdom
1881 establishments in the United Kingdom